Seton Gordon CBE (1886–1977) was a Scottish naturalist, photographer and folklorist.

Gordon began exploring the Highlands of Scotland as a boy, particularly the Cairngorms. He later became a world-famous naturalist, photographer and folklorist, describing the wildlife and scenery of Scotland. His books are still widely available, and a recent anthology has been published.  Their appeal is based upon the knowledge of natural history displayed, together with his ability as a writer.

Born in Aberdeen, he lived on Deeside and was educated privately and at Oxford. Given cameras as a young man, his books were illustrated with photographs taken by himself and his first wife, Audrey Gordon, for many years his companion and helper in the field.

He accompanied the Oxford University Expedition to Spitsbergen in 1921 and took many photographs there, but the birds of the Scottish mountains and glens were always his real passion. From his home in Aviemore (and later the Isle of Skye), he made regular forays into the wilds.

Of all the Scottish birds, the golden eagle was his favourite. He is believed to have been the first to photograph both the snow bunting and the whooper swan at nests in Scotland. He was appointed a Commander of the Order of the British Empire (CBE) in the 1939 Birthday Honours, "for services to literature and natural history".

He judged many piping competitions (often with Angus MacPherson and Jock MacDonald of Viewfield) including his own favourite, the Glenfinnan Gathering. He was close to many of the landed families of Scotland.

Publications 
Here is a listing of his publications:

 1907 – Birds of the Loch and Mountain (Cassell)
 1912 – The Charm of the Hills (Cassell)
 1915 – Hill Birds of Scotland  (Edward Arnold)
 1920 – Land of the Hills and the Glens – Wild Life of Iona & the Inner Hebrides (Cassell)
 1921 – Wanderings of a Naturalist (Cassell)
 1922 – Amid snowy wastes (Cassell)
 1923 – Hebridean Memories (Cassell)
 1925 – The Cairngorm Hills of Scotland (Cassell)
 1926 – The Immortal Isles (Williams & Norgate)
 1927 – Days With the Golden Eagle (Williams & Norgate)
 1929 – The Charm of Skye: The Winged Isle (Cassell)
 1931 – In the Highlands (Cassell)
 1933 – Islands of the West (Cassell)
 1935 – Highways and Byways in the West Highlands (Macmillan)
 1935 – Sea-Gulls in London (Cassell)
 1936 – Thirty Years of Nature Photography: a Personal Record of Two Observers (Cassell)
 1937 – Afoot in Wild Places (Cassell)
 1937 – Edward Grey of Fallodon and His Birds (Country Life)
 1938 – Wild Birds in Britain (Batsford)
 1941 – In Search of Northern Birds (Eyre & Spottiswoode)
 1944 – A Highland Year (Eyre & Spottiswoode)
 1948 – Highways and Byways in the Central Highlands (Macmillan)
 1950 – Afoot in the Hebrides (Country Life)
 1951 – Highlands of Scotland (Robert Hale)
 1955 – The Golden Eagle, King of Birds (Collins)
 1956 – Colourful Scotland (Oliver & Boyd)
 1963 – Highland Days (Cassell)
 1971 – Highland Summer (Cassell)

Co-authored:
 1933 – Tales Of The Untamed (Collins)
 1936 – Nature in Britain: an illustrated survey (Batsford)
 1960 – Scotland's Splendour (Collins)

References

Further reading

External links 
 Review of autobiography by Hamish Brown

1886 births
1977 deaths
Fellows of the Zoological Society of London
Scottish naturalists
Scottish photographers
20th-century naturalists
Commanders of the Order of the British Empire